Ernest George Schwiebert (1931–2005) was born in Chicago on June 5, 1931. An architect by profession, Ernest "Ernie" Schwiebert was a renowned angler and angling author. Schwiebert spent his childhood in the Midwest, attended high school at New Trier, north of Chicago, earned his bachelor's degree in architecture from Ohio State University, and earned two doctorates at Princeton in architecture and the history and philosophy of architecture.

Life story
Ernest Schwiebert married Sara Mills in 1957 and had one son (Erik) and two grandchildren (Elisabeth and Turner). Having served in the Air Force, he specialized in planning airports and military bases. Traveling on business, he also visited some of the world's best fishing streams, feeding a passion that had begun during boyhood vacations on the Pere Marquette River in Michigan. In 1977 he left the engineering firm of Tippets, Abbott, McCarthy & Stratton, New York. He made scholarly contributions throughout his life as a writer, architect, and student of the art and science of fly fishing for trout and salmon. He wrote more than 15 books about fly fishing and architecture.

Ernest Schwiebert, also known as Ernie, was a pioneer in the fishery conservation movement and was involved in the founding of Trout Unlimited, Theodore Gordon Flyfishers and the Federation of Fly Fishers. He has served as a Director of both Theodore Gordon Flyfishers and the Atlantic Salmon Federation, and on the scientific advisory boards of TU, FFF and The Nature Conservancy. In recognition of his contributions, a Trout Unlimited Chapter in New Jersey is named for him.

Ernest Schwiebert Chapter Trout Unlimited #227 was founded July 28, 1974. The chapter’s website is https://www.esctu.org/ and its local waters are Stony Brook. ESCTU maintains a social media presence on Facebook and Instagram. 

He was best known for his extensive writings about fly-fishing. His books include Matching the Hatch (1955), Nymphs (1973), Salmon of the World (1970), and the two-volume Trout (1978). He wrote numerous magazine articles and short stories which were published in such collections as Remembrances of Rivers Past (1972), Death of a Riverkeeper (1980), and A River for Christmas (1988). An often referenced and quoted writer, Schwiebert has over twelve references in Arnold Gingrich’s book The Fishing in Print and fourteen references in Paul Schullery’s American Fly Fishing, A History. Gingrich considered Schwiebert’s position impregnable as the leading angling author of our time and that he had an impressive ability to absorb entomological detail and convert it into pleasing prose for his readers.

Awards
His numerous awards and honors included the Gold Medal of the American Institute of Architects, The Arnold Gingrich Literary Prize (1978 Federation of Flyfishers), the Aldo Starker Leopold Memorial Award (1994 International Wild Trout Symposium), and life memberships with the Theodore Gordon Flyfishers, Federation of Flyfishers, and The Anglers' Club of New York. He was a member of the Henryville Flyfishers, the Spring Ridge Club, and many other anglers clubs.

Quotations
The following excerpt from the closing speech at 2005 opening ceremonies at the American Museum of Fly Fishing typifies the eloquence of Ernie Schwiebert and his writings.

I will conclude with a story.

My obsession with fishing began in childhood, watching bluegills and pumpkinseeds and perch under a rickety dock, below a simple cedar-shingled cottage in southern Michigan. My obsession with trout began there too, when my mother drove north into town for groceries, and took me along with the promise of chocolate ice cream. We crossed a stream that was utterly unlike those near Chicago, fetid and foul-smelling, or choked with the silts of farm-country tillage. It flowed swift and crystalline over the bottom of ochre cobblestones and pebbles and like Hemingway’s “Big Two-Hearted River,” it mysteriously disappeared into thickets of cedar sweepers downstream.

And a man was fishing there.

The current was smooth, but it tumbled swiftly around his legs. It was a different kind of fishing, utterly unlike watching a red-and-white bobber on a tepid childhood pond, with its lilypad and cattail margins, and its callings of redwinged blackbirds. His amber line worked back and forth in the sunlight, and he dropped his fly on the water briefly, only to tease it free of the current, and strip the moisture from its barbules with more casting. It seemed more like the grace of ballet than fishing.

And then the man hooked a fish.
 
My mother called to the angler, and gave me permission to run and see his prize. I remember getting my feet muddy and wet, with a Biblical plague of cockleburrs at my ankles, but it did not matter. The fish was still in the man’s landing met, and he raised it dripping and shining in his hand. It was a brook trout of six inches, its dorsal surfaces drak with blue and olive vermiculations, and its flanks clouded with dusky parr markings. Its belly and lower fins were a bright tangerine, with edgings of alabaster and ebony, and it glowed like a jeweler’s tray of opals and moonstones and rubies. I had witnessed something beautiful, and I wanted to be part of it.

People often ask why I fish, and after seventy-odd years, I am beginning to understand.

I fish because of Beauty.

Everything about our sport (and our cause in terms of TU) is beautiful. Its more than five centuries of manuscript and books and folios are beautiful. Its artifacts of rods and beautifully machined reels are beautiful. Its old wading staffs and split-willow creels, and the delicate artifice of its flies, are beautiful. Dressing such confections of fur, feathers and steel is beautiful, and our worktables are littered with gorgeous scraps of tragopan and golden pheasant and blue chattered and Coq de Leon. The best of sporting art is beautiful. The riverscapes that sustain the fish are beautiful. Our methods of seeking them are beautiful, and we find ourselves enthralled with the quicksilver poetry of the fish.

And in our contentious time of partisan hubris, selfishness, and outright mendacity, Beauty itself may prove the most endangered thing of all.
 
Ernest Schwiebert - 2005

Ernest George Schwiebert, Ph.D., 74, died December 10, 2005 at his home in Princeton, New Jersey.

Works

References

1931 births
2005 deaths
Angling writers
Austin E. Knowlton School of Architecture alumni
Princeton University alumni
Fly fishing
20th-century American male writers